Plesiolena is a small genus of South American mygalomorph spiders in the family Actinopodidae. It was first described by Pablo A. Goloboff and Norman I. Platnick in 1987, and it has only been found in Chile. The name is a combination of "plesiomorphy" and the genus Missulena.  it contains only 2 species: P. bonneti and P. jorgelina.

See also
 List of Actinopodidae species

References

Further reading

Actinopodidae
Mygalomorphae genera
Taxa named by Norman I. Platnick
Spiders of South America
Endemic fauna of Chile